WLSM-FM (107.1 FM) is a radio station licensed to serve the community of Louisville, Mississippi. The station is owned by WH Properties, Inc., and airs a variety format.

The station was assigned the WLSM-FM call letters by the Federal Communications Commission on February 8, 1966.

References

External links
 Official Website
 FCC Public Inspection File for WLSM-FM
 FCC History Card for WLSM-FM
 

LSM-FM
Radio stations established in 1966
1966 establishments in Mississippi
Variety radio stations in the United States
Winston County, Mississippi